Nerkin Shengavit (also, Nerkin Shengavit’) is a part of Shengavit District in Yerevan, Armenia.

References 

Populated places in Yerevan